Barons Court Theatre is a small theatre of 52 cinema-style seats located in the basement of The Curtains Up public house in Comeragh Road in West London. Founded in 1991, the Barons Court Theatre features a programme of short-run plays and afternoon magic shows that are frequently changed.

Ron Phillips has been the artistic director since the theatre's inception, and productions at Barouns Courthe Theatre included Sophocles's Antigone, Dostoyevsky's Crime and Punishment, Hardy's Tess of the d'Urbervilles, Ibsen's A Doll's House, Shakespeare's Richard III & Shakespeare's Women.  Noted performers who have performed at the theatre include Sara Kestelman in Bitter Fruits of Palestine.

The theatre also hosted The Magic Cavern, a theatre show of magic and illusion, presented by international magician Richard Leigh. 

During the COVID-19 pandemic, Barons Court Theatre has been closed for over a year. In 2021, artistic director Ron Phillips retired and was succeeded by Sharon Willems, previous artistic director of Kibo Productions.

References

External links
 - Official Website
Barons Court Theatre on offwestend.com
Barons Court Theatre on londontheatre.co.uk
Barons Court Theatre archive on uktw.co.uk

Pub theatres in London
Theatres in the London Borough of Hammersmith and Fulham
Theatres completed in 1991
1991 establishments in England
Buildings and structures in the London Borough of Hammersmith and Fulham
Fulham